Sir Henry Ludlow (1834–1903) was an English barrister and judge, Chief Justice of the Leeward Islands. He was knighted by letters patent in 1890.

References 

Knights Bachelor
1834 births
1903 deaths
Chief justices of the Leeward Islands